Metallostichodes povolnyi is a species of snout moth. It is found on Sumatra.

References

Moths described in 1983
Phycitini